Kařez is a municipality and village in  Rokycany District in the Plzeň Region of the Czech Republic. It has about 700 inhabitants.

Transport
The municipality is located on a train line leading from Prague to Plzeň. There is a train station which is served by regional trains.

References

Villages in Rokycany District